Marimo (also known as Cladophora ball, moss ball, moss ball pet, or lake ball) is a rare growth form of Aegagropila linnaei (a species of filamentous green algae) in which the algae grow into large green balls with a velvety appearance.

The species can be found in a number of lakes and rivers in Japan and Northern Europe. Colonies of marimo balls are known to form in Japan and Iceland, but their population has been declining.

Classification and name
Marimo were first described in the 1820s by Anton E. Sauter, found in Lake Zell, Austria. The genus Aegagropila was established by Friedrich T. Kützing (1843) with A. linnaei as the type species based on its formation of spherical aggregations, but all the Aegagropila species were transferred to subgenus Aegagropila of the genus Cladophora later by the same author (Kützing 1849). Subsequently, A. linnaei was placed in the genus Cladophora in the Cladophorales and was renamed Cladophora aegagropila (L.) Rabenhorst and Cl. sauteri (Nees ex Kütz.) Kütz. Extensive DNA research in 2002 returned the name to Aegagropila linnaei. The presence of chitin in the cell walls makes it distinct from the genus Cladophora.

The algae was named marimo by the Japanese botanist Takiya Kawakami in 1898. Mari is a bouncy play ball. Mo is a generic term for plants that grow in water. The native names in Ainu are torasampe (lake goblin) and tokarip (lake roller). They are sometimes sold in aquariums under the name "Japanese moss balls" although they are unrelated to moss. In Iceland the lake balls are called kúluskítur by the local fishermen at Lake Mývatn (kúla = ball, skítur = muck) where the "muck" is any weeds that get entangled in their fishing nets. The generic name Aegagropila is Greek for "goat hair".

Growth forms

The algae has three growth forms:

 It can grow on rocks, usually found on the shaded side of the rocks.
 It can exist as free-floating filaments. Small tufts of unattached filaments frequently form a carpet on the muddy lake bottom.
 It can form a lake ball where the algae grow into sizable balls of densely packed algal filaments that radiate from the center. The balls do not have a kernel of any sort.

Ecology

The existence of marimo colonies depends on the adaptation of the species to low light conditions, combined with the dynamic interaction of wind-induced currents, light regime, lake morphology, bottom substrate and sedimentation.

Size 

Shape 
The round shape of the marimo is maintained by gentle wave action that occasionally turns it. The best environment for that are shallow lakes with sandy bottoms.

The balls are green all the way round which guarantees that they can photosynthesize no matter which side is turned upwards. Inside, the ball is also green and packed with dormant chloroplasts which become active in a matter of hours if the ball breaks apart. The wave action also cleans the balls of dead organic material.

As some colonies have two or even three layers of marimo balls, wave action is needed to tumble them around so each ball reaches the light. The spherical shape has a low surface-area-to-volume ratio compared to a leaf, which limits photosynthesis and therefore limits the maximum size of the marimo balls.

Habitat 
Marimo's preferred habitat is in lakes with a low or moderate biological activity, and with moderate or high levels of calcium.

Distribution 
The species is mainly found in the areas of Europe previously covered in glaciers (Northern-Europe), and in several places in Japan. It has been found in North America, but it is rare, as well as in Australia.

Population decline
The species is sensitive to the amount of nutrients in the water. An excess of nutrients (due to agriculture and fish farming), along with mud deposition from human activity are thought to be the main causes for its disappearance from many lakes.

The species still exists in Lake Zell in Austria (where it was first discovered in the 1820s) but the lake ball growth form has not been found there since around 1910. The same has happened in most locations in England and Scotland, where mainly the attached form can be found.

Dense colonies of marimo were discovered in Lake Mývatn in Iceland in 1978, but they have shrunk considerably since then. By 2014 the marimo had almost completely disappeared from the lake due to an excess of nutrients. The ecosystem is now improving and small marimo balls are forming again.

The species can still be found in several places in Japan, but populations have also declined there. At Lake Akan, a great effort is spent on the conservation of the lake balls.

The marimo has been a protected species in Japan since the 1920s, and in Iceland since 2006. Lake Akan is protected as a national park and Lake Mývatn is protected as a nature reserve.

Cultural aspects 
Marimo balls are a rare curiosity. In Japan, the Ainu people hold a three-day marimo festival every October at Lake Akan.

Because of their appealing appearance, the lake balls also serve as a medium for environmental education. Small balls sold as souvenirs are hand rolled from free-floating filaments. A widely marketed stuffed toy character known as Marimokkori takes the anthropomorphic form of the marimo algae as one part of its design.

Marimo are sometimes sold for display in aquariums; those often originate from Ukrainian lakes such as the Shatskyi Lakes. Balls sold in Japanese aquarium shops are of European origin; collecting them from Lake Akan is prohibited.

Contamination
On 2 March 2021, the United States Geological Survey was notified that zebra mussels had been discovered in moss balls sold in pet stores across North America. By 8 March, invasive zebra mussels had been detected in moss balls in 21 states. These discoveries were prompted by the initial find at a Seattle Petco. Owners of fish tanks were urged to decontaminate the moss balls by boiling, freezing or bleaching them before disposing of them to prevent spread to local waterways. Petco and PetSmart voluntarily recalled moss balls in their stores. If the mussels reach open water in Washington, they could cost the state $100 million each year in maintenance for power and water systems.

See also
List of Special Natural Monuments in Japan
 Codium bursa, a round marine algae

Notes

References

Bibliography

 
 
 
 Nagasawa, S., Wakana, I. and Nagao, M. 1994. Mathematical characterization of photosynthetic and respiratory property regarding the size of Marimo's aggregation. Marimo Research 3:16–25.
 Yoshida, T., Nagao, M., Wakana, I. and Yokohama, Y. 1994. Photosynthetic and respiratory property in the large size spherical aggregations of "Marimo". Marimo Research 3:1–11.
 Yoshida, T., Horiguchi, T., Nagao, M., Wakana, I. and Yokohama, Y. 1998. Ultrastructural study of chloroplasts of inner layer cells of a spherical aggregation of "Marimo" (Chlorophyta) and structural changes seen in organelles after exposing to light. Marimo Research 7:1–13.
 Wakana, I. 1992. A bibliography relating to "Marimo" and their habitats. Marimo Research 1:1–12.

External links

Ainu Tribe - Legend of the Marimo
Lake Akan and marimo in the Japan Atlas

Pithophoraceae
Commemoration of Carl Linnaeus
Taxa named by Friedrich Traugott Kützing